Is This Sexual Harassment? was a BBC television programme.

It features twenty people
watching and discussing a fictional scenario featuring Cat and Ryan.

References

BBC Television shows
British educational television series
2019 television specials
Sexual harassment in the United Kingdom